Alexander Konstantinovich Tikhomirov (born 3 January 1947) is a Russian former pair skater who represented the Soviet Union. With Lyudmila Suslina, he is the 1968 Winter Universiade bronze medalist. The pair also won silver at the 1967 Blue Swords, silver at the 1967 Prize of Moscow News, and gold at the 1968 Blue Swords.

References 

1947 births
Russian male pair skaters
Soviet male pair skaters
Living people
Figure skaters from Moscow
Universiade medalists in figure skating
Universiade bronze medalists for the Soviet Union
Competitors at the 1968 Winter Universiade